"Try Me" is the debut single by American hip hop recording artist Dej Loaf. The song was released on October 15th, 2014 and was produced by DDS. The song peaked at number 45 on the U.S. Billboard Hot 100.

Music video
The music video for "Try Me" was released on September 24, 2014 on her YouTube account, and was later released on her Vevo account.

Commercial performance
"Try Me" peaked at number 45 on the U.S. Billboard Hot 100. The song was certified Gold on April 3, 2015 in the United States.

Charts

References

External links

2014 debut singles
2014 songs
Dej Loaf songs
Columbia Records singles
Songs written by Dej Loaf